White sugar sponge cake (also called white sugar cake  and white sugar pastry) is a type of Chinese pastry.

It is made from rice flour, white sugar, water, and a leavening agent.

While it is called a "cake", it is not served as a circular round cake. It is usually purchased as an individual square piece or a mini triangle. The cake is white in color, with a spongy and soft consistency. The taste is sweet, and sometimes has a slightly sour taste due to fermentation of the batter prior to cooking. Like most Chinese cakes, it is steamed, giving it a moist, soft, and fluffy texture, as opposed to a dry and firm one. If left exposed to the air, it hardens quickly.  It is usually kept under some cover to preserve moistness. It is typically served hot, because when it is cold it is not as soft and moist. The batter is either poured over a bowl in a steamer, a Chinese steamer cloth or aluminum foil. If made from brown rice flour and brown sugar it is called a brown sugar sponge cake.

A Vietnamese version of the cake, called bánh bò, differs from the Chinese version in that it often uses coconut milk as an ingredient, and does not have the sourness that often typifies the Chinese version.

Names
The cake has a variety of regional names, including:
 Baak Tong Gou (Cantonese)
 Bai Tang Gao (Mandarin)
 Pak Thong Koh (Malay)
 Puting Asukal Bibingka (Filipino)

See also
 Bánh bò
 Idli
 Jiuniang
 List of steamed foods

References 

Cantonese cuisine
Hong Kong cuisine
Chinese rice dishes
Fermented foods
Steamed foods
Rice cakes